The Segre classification is an algebraic classification of rank two symmetric tensors. The resulting types are then known as Segre types. It is most commonly applied to the energy–momentum tensor (or the Ricci tensor) and primarily finds application in the classification of exact solutions in general relativity.

See also
Corrado Segre
Jordan normal form
Petrov classification

References
 See section 5.1 for the Segre classification.

Linear algebra
Tensors
Tensors in general relativity